Blowing Smoke may refer to:

Smoke ring

Film and TV
"Blowing Smoke" (Mad Men)
Freak Talks About Sex, released for home video as Blowin' Smoke, 1999 film starring Steve Zahn
Blowing Smoke, documentary on cigars by James Orr (filmmaker)
Blowing Smoke, a 2004 TV film starring Estella Warren and Daniel Roebuck

Music

Albums
Blowin' Smoke, Smokey Wilson album 2003

Songs
"Blowin' Smoke", song recorded by Kacey Musgraves
"Blowin' Smoke", song by Peter Frampton from Fingerprints (Peter Frampton album) 2006 	
"Blowin' Smoke", song by Soundgarden and Matt Cameron 2010
"Blowin' Smoke", song by Pete Nice and DJ Richie Rich from Dust to Dust (Pete Nice and DJ Richie Rich album)
"Blowin' Smoke", song by David Ball from Thinkin' Problem
"Blowin' Smoke", song by Nashville Pussy from Let Them Eat Pussy
"Blowin' Smoke", song by Venomin James
"Blowing Smoke", song by Lil' Flip from Roofback 2006 	
"Blowing Smoke", song by rock band The Swirling Eddies from Outdoor Elvis; covered on When Worlds Collide: A Tribute to Daniel Amos